Deluge (fireboat) may refer to:
 , a Baltimore fireboat that fought a fire aboard the Kerry Range in 1917
 , a former fireboat, now a registered National Historic Landmark, in New Orleans
 , a fireboat that served for forty years in Milwaukee, Wisconsin

Ship names